Georg Johannes Rickhey (25 August 1898, Hildesheim – 1966) was a German engineer and the general director of Mittelwerk GmbH in Dora-Mittelbau.

Rickhey, a doctor of engineering, joined the Nazi Party in October 1931 as member number 664,050. 
From 1940, he guided Gauamt Technik in Essen and was promoted in 1942 to the leader of NSDAP Gau Essen and was also at the same time authorized officer in an Essen mining company.

During the Second World War he held a number of positions with the Reichsministerium für Bewaffnung und Munition (Reich Ministry for Armament and Munitions) before becoming manager of Demag, a tank production company, in 1942.

He became head of Mittelwerk GmbH in Dora-Mittelbau from April 1944, overseeing production of the V-1 flying bomb and V-2 rocket. His work on these weapons saw him awarded the Knights Cross of the War Merit Cross along with Walter Dornberger and Wernher von Braun.

Arrested in 1945, he was taken by the U.S. Army to live at Wright-Patterson Air Force Base, Ohio where he worked under the terms of Operation Paperclip. He was subsequently indicted as part of the Dachau Trials of 1947 under accusations that he had worked closely with the SS and Gestapo and witnessed executions. He was acquitted due to a lack of evidence. Rickhey returned to Wright-Patterson Air Force Base after the trial ended. He did not return to his work in Operation Paperclip.

See also
Dora Trial

References

1898 births
1966 deaths
People from Hildesheim
German military engineers
Recipients of the Knights Cross of the War Merit Cross
Dachau trials
People indicted for war crimes
Mittelbau-Dora concentration camp personnel
Operation Paperclip
Engineers from Lower Saxony
V-weapons people
German emigrants to the United States